Joseph Bouchardy (1810–1870) was an author, playwright, engraver, and member of the Jeune France/Bouzingo and Cénacle movements. The enormous popularity of his plays earned him the nickname "The King of the Boulevard." In 1868 he was given the rank of chevalier from the Legion d'Honneur. He is the brother of Anatole Bouchardy.

According to Théophile Gautier, he died unhappily: "He had become a gaunt old man, broken, destroyed by grief, and by the sadness of authors who have experienced the intoxication of success, and whose popularity retires without being able to appreciate the reasons why it went away."

References 

http://bouzingo.blogspot.com/p/timeline.html
http://www.sylvie-lecuyer.net/lepetitcenacle.html
http://oxfordindex.oup.com/view/10.1093/oi/authority.20110803095520411

External links
 

Writers from Paris
1810 births
1870 deaths
19th-century French dramatists and playwrights
19th-century French male writers